Arginase, type II is an arginase protein that in humans is encoded by the ARG2 gene.

Function 

Arginase catalyzes the hydrolysis of arginine to ornithine and urea.  At least two isoforms of mammalian arginase exists (types I and II, this enzyme) which differ in their tissue distribution, subcellular localization, immunologic crossreactivity and physiologic function.  The type II isoform encoded by this gene, is located in the mitochondria and expressed in extra-hepatic tissues, especially kidney.  The physiologic role of this isoform is poorly understood; it is thought to play a role in nitric oxide and polyamine metabolism.  Transcript variants of the type II gene resulting from the use of alternative polyadenylation sites have been described.

References

External links

Further reading 

 
 
 
 
 
 
 
 
 

EC 3.5.1